Igor Valeryevich Shatsky (born 11 May 1989) is a Kazakhstani footballer who plays as a goalkeeper for FC Shakhter Karagandy and the Kazakhstan national team.

Career

Club
On 5 January 2020, FC Tobol announced the signing of Shatsky on a contract until the end of 2020.

International
Shatsky made his international debut for Kazakhstan on 21 February 2019, coming on as a half-time substitute for Dmytro Nepohodov in a friendly match against Moldova, which finished as a 1–0 win.

Career statistics

International

References

External links
 
 
 
 

1989 births
Living people
Sportspeople from Karaganda
Kazakhstani footballers
Kazakhstan international footballers
Association football goalkeepers
FC Shakhter Karagandy players
FC Zhenis Astana players
FC Tobol players
Kazakhstan Premier League players